The Catholic Church in Peru comprises seven ecclesiastical provinces each headed by an archbishop. The provinces are in turn subdivided into 19 dioceses and seven archdioceses each headed by a bishop or an archbishop. There are also 10 territorial prelatures, 8 apostolic vicariates and one Military Ordinariate in Peru.

List of Dioceses

Ecclesiastical province of Arequipa 
Archdiocese of Arequipa
Diocese of Puno
Diocese of Tacna y Moquegua
Prelature of Ayaviri
Prelature of Chuquibamba
Prelature of Juli

Ecclesiastical province of Ayacucho 
Archdiocese of Ayacucho
Diocese of Huancavélica
Prelature of Caravelí

Ecclesiastical province of Cuzco 
Archdiocese of Cuzco
Diocese of Abancay
Prelature of Chuquibambilla
Diocese of Sicuani

Ecclesiastical province of Huancayo 
Archdiocese of Huancayo
Diocese of Huánuco
Diocese of Tarma

Ecclesiastical province of Lima 
Archdiocese of Lima
Diocese of Callao
Diocese of Carabayllo
Diocese of Chosica
Diocese of Huacho
Diocese of Ica
Diocese of Lurín
Prelature of Yauyos

Ecclesiastical province of Piura 
Archdiocese of Piura
Diocese of Chachapoyas
Diocese of Chiclayo
Diocese of Chulucanas
Prelature of Chota

Ecclesiastical province of Trujillo 
Archdiocese of Trujillo
Diocese of Cajamarca
Diocese of Chimbote
Diocese of Huaraz
Diocese of Huarí
Prelature of Huamachuco
Prelature of Moyobamba

Vicariates
Vicariate Apostolic of Iquitos
Vicariate Apostolic of Jaén en Peru o San Francisco Javier
Vicariate Apostolic of Pucallpa
Vicariate Apostolic of Puerto Maldonado
Vicariate Apostolic of Requena
Vicariate Apostolic of San José de Amazonas
Vicariate Apostolic of San Ramón
Vicariate Apostolic of Yurimaguas

Military Ordinariate
Military Ordinariate of Peru

Defunct Circumscription
Apostolic Vicariate of Ucayali

Gallery of Archdioceses

External links 
Catholic-Hierarchy entry.
GCatholic.org.

Peru
Catholic dioceses